Mozer is an unincorporated community in Pendleton County, West Virginia, United States.

The community was named after E. E. Mozer.

References

Unincorporated communities in Pendleton County, West Virginia
Unincorporated communities in West Virginia